Totora may refer to the following:

Totora (plant), a South American plant
Totora, Cochabamba, a town in Bolivia
Totora District, in Amazonas, Peru

See also
Tōtara, a tree endemic to New Zealand